Independence Day in Somaliland is an annual celebration held on 18 May in Somaliland to mark the polity's declaration of independence from the Somali Democratic Republic, a unilateral proclamation which remains unrecognized the world over.  Although internationally seen only as an autonomous area of Somalia, the territory's self-declared independence has endured, and the twentieth anniversary was celebrated in 2011 at the National Palace in Hargeisa, Somaliland's capital, with shops closing down for the day.

Gallery

References

Culture of Somaliland
May observances